Pocahontas is an unincorporated community in Coffee County, Tennessee, United States.

Notes

Unincorporated communities in Coffee County, Tennessee
Unincorporated communities in Tennessee